Sunshine Mountain is a  mountain summit located in San Miguel County, in Colorado, United States. It is situated nine miles southwest of the community of Telluride, in the Lizard Head Wilderness, on land managed by Uncompahgre National Forest. It is part of the San Juan Mountains which is a subset of the Rocky Mountains. Sunshine Mountain is situated 24 miles west of the Continental Divide, 2.75 miles east of Wilson Peak, and 1.8 mile northeast of Lizard Head, the nearest higher neighbor. The mountain is composed of rock of the San Juan Formation overlaying Telluride Conglomerate, in turn overlaying Mancos Shale. The mountain's name, which has been officially adopted by the United States Board on Geographic Names, was in use before 1899 when Henry Gannett published it in A Dictionary of Altitudes in the United States.

Climate 
According to the Köppen climate classification system, Sunshine Mountain is located in an alpine subarctic climate zone with long, cold, snowy winters, and cool to warm summers. Due to its altitude, it receives precipitation all year, as snow in winter, and as thunderstorms in summer, with a dry period in late spring. Precipitation runoff from the mountain drains into tributaries of the San Miguel River.

Gallery

See also

References

External links 

 Weather forecast: Sunshine Mountain
 NGS Data Sheet
 Sunshine Mountain: Alltrails.com 

Mountains of San Miguel County, Colorado
San Juan Mountains (Colorado)
Mountains of Colorado
North American 3000 m summits
Uncompahgre National Forest